WWTH (100.7 FM), Oscoda, Michigan, is a radio station broadcasting a classic rock format to the Oscoda, Tawas,  Alpena area of northeastern lower Michigan. The station is known as "Thunder Rock", The Sunrise Side's Classic Rock."

History

WWTH was originally WCLS "Sunny 100-dot-7," airing a satellite-fed adult contemporary format from Jones Radio. For a time, WCLS simulcast its programming on 93.9 FM WCLX in Mio, which is now WAVC. In 1998, WCLS was sold from Spectrum Communications to Ives Broadcasting, which also owned WHSB 107.7 FM in Alpena at the time, and became "Kix 100.7," a satellite-fed country station. After only about a year, "Kix" reverted to the "Sunny" satellite AC format.

The second incarnation of "Sunny 100-dot-7" continued until 2004, when the station went silent; it briefly returned to the air simulcasting 99.9 WHAK-FM and then 107.7 WHSB before going silent again. In December 2004, Edwards Communications acquired WCLS along with WHSB and WHAK-AM/FM, and in April 2005, the "Thunder Country" format debuted on 100.7 FM (which sported the new calls WWTH) and 960 AM WHAK. Originally the station was chiefly locally automated with some local announcers, but the station soon went with the "CD Country" satellite format from Jones Radio Networks (since absorbed into Dial Global's Hot Country format).  WHAK-AM 960 broke away from the simulcast in the summer of 2012 to simulcast the classic hits format of WHAK-FM.

As "Thunder Country" from 2005 to 2013, WWTH broadcast the "Hot Country" (known on-air as "Today's New Hit Country") satellite feed from Dial Global. The station switched formats to classic rock at 11:00 AM on May 24, 2013. The station syndicates the popular morning show Free Beer and Hot Wings.

Sources 
Michiguide.com - WWTH History

External links

References

Wth
Classic rock radio stations in the United States
Radio stations established in 2005